Flemington is a city in Liberty County, Georgia, United States. It is a part of the Hinesville-Fort Stewart metropolitan statistical area. The population was 743 at the 2010 census, up from 369 at the 2000 census.

History
A post office called Flemington was established in 1889, and remained in operation until 1966. The community was named after William Fleming, a pioneer settler. The Georgia General Assembly incorporated Flemington in 1941.

Geography

It is bordered to the west by Hinesville, the county seat. U.S. Route 84 passes through the center of Flemington, leading west into Hinesville and east  to Interstate 95 on the east side of Midway.

Demographics

As of the 2010 United States Census, there were 743 people living in the city. The racial makeup of the city was 49.1% Black, 34.7% White, 5.2% Asian and 4.2% from two or more races. 6.7% were Hispanic or Latino of any race.

As of the census of 2000, there were 369 people, 148 households, and 96 families living in the city. The racial makeup of the city was 57.18% White, 27.91% African American, 0.54% Native American, 5.15% Asian, 0.27% Pacific Islander, 7.05% from other races, and 1.90% from two or more races. Hispanic or Latino of any race were 10.84% of the population.

There were 148 households, out of which 34.5% had children under the age of 18 living with them, 48.0% were married couples living together, 12.2% had a female householder with no husband present, and 35.1% were non-families. 29.7% of all households were made up of individuals, and 4.7% had someone living alone who was 65 years of age or older.  The average household size was 2.49 and the average family size was 3.00.

In the city, the population was spread out, with 26.8% under the age of 18, 11.1% from 18 to 24, 38.2% from 25 to 44, 16.8% from 45 to 64, and 7.0% who were 65 years of age or older.  The median age was 34 years. For every 100 females, there were 107.3 males.  For every 100 females age 18 and over, there were 101.5 males.

The median income for a household in the city was $37,917, and the median income for a family was $53,125. Males had a median income of $32,250 versus $26,875 for females. The per capita income for the city was $16,638.  About 8.0% of families and 10.9% of the population were below the poverty line, including 6.7% of those under age 18 and 22.2% of those age 65 or over.

Education
The Liberty County School District operates public schools that serve Flemington.

References

Cities in Georgia (U.S. state)
Cities in Liberty County, Georgia
Hinesville metropolitan area